State Highway 160 (SH 160) is a Texas state highway that runs from SH 78 to U.S. Highway 69 and SH 11 in Whitewright. It was designated on March 19, 1930 along its current route, except that its north end was at Bells. It was a renumbering of SH 78A. On October 25, 1932, SH 160 was extended to Denison. On September 26, 1939, the part from Denison to Whitewright was cancelled as it was cosigned with US 69.

Junction list

References

160
Transportation in Collin County, Texas
Transportation in Grayson County, Texas